Elias Nashivela is a Namibian boxer. A middleweight, Nashivela competed for Namibia at the 2010 Commonwealth Games in the Middleweight division. In his first match, he beat Albert Blaize of Dominica. When the referee stopped the fight, Nashivela was up 19-0 in points in the 2nd round.

In 2006, Nashivela was a member of the under-20 Namibian national boxing team.

References

External links 
 

Year of birth missing (living people)
Living people
Middleweight boxers
Boxers at the 2010 Commonwealth Games
Commonwealth Games competitors for Namibia
Namibian male boxers